The JSC Klimov (or Joint Stock Company Klimov) presently manufactures internationally certified gas turbine engines, main gearboxes and accessory drive gearboxes for transport aircraft.

It may have used the designation Aircraft Repair Factory (aviazavod, ARZ) 117 during the Soviet period.

History
The Klimov OKB was formed in the early 1930s to produce and improve upon the liquid-cooled Hispano-Suiza 12Y V-12 piston engine for which the USSR had acquired a license.  At that time Klimov also manufactured motorcycles.

In 1946 the British government allowed Rolls-Royce to sell a number of Nene and Derwent V turbojet engines to the Soviet Union. Klimov OKB was given the task of "metrifying" the British designs, without the knowledge or permission of the West, as the VK-1 and RD-500.

Klimov United Engine Company is now located in Saint Petersburg.

It used the nationalised buildings originally erected by 1914 in the city's present-day Vyborgsky District for the joint stock Russian Renault automotive works, adding new workshop and administrative premises on the land in Bolshoy Sampsoniyevskiy Prospect avenue near the present Kantemirovskaya Street. By 2020 the premises have been vacated for redevelopment for a housing project.

Piston engines
 M-100 – Hispano-Suiza 12Ydrs built under license
 M-103 – improved M-100
 M-105 – improved M-103; later redesignated as VK-105
 M-110
 M-120 – prototype inline 18-cylinder with three M-103A blocks in an inverted Y configuration; cancelled due to engine malfunction
 During World War II, designations were changed from M (motor) to VK (the lead designer's initials)
 VK-106 – prototype developed from M-105 with improved performance at lower altitudes; cancelled due to cooling problems
 VK-107
 VK-108 – prototype version of VK-107 with 1850 hp on takeoff; never entered production
 VK-109
 VK-110
 VK-150

Gas turbine engines 

 RD-10 (along AI Ivchenko Progress (Motor Sich), KMPO & SNTK Kuznetsov (OAO Motorostroitel), elsewhere)
 RD-33 and variants, derivatives: RD-5000B for UCAV UAV like MiG Skat
 RD-93MA is a derivative of the RD-33 and is specifically designed for single engine light fighter jets. It uses the BARK-93MA automatic control system
 Klimov VK-10M 22 to 24,200 lbf (97.87 - 107.647 kN)
 RD-35 , agreement with Slovakian PSLM ZVL
 RD-45
 GTD-350
 RD-500 , copy of the Rolls-Royce Derwent V
 TV2-117 (built by Isotov from 1959–1964)
 TV3-117 variants
 TV3-117VM VMA for Mil and Kamov helicopters
 TV3-117VMA-SBM1 Turboprop for the An-140 , MiG-110 , Be-32K
 ТV7-117 variants
 TV7-117S Turboprop for Aircraft
 Klimov TV and VK derived Turboprop and Turbofan engines powerplants
 Klimov TV17-117 new perspective engine, follow up of the TV family
 VK-1
 VK-3 turbojet 
 VK- (and TV-) turbojets turbofan, gas turbines, turboprop turboshafts
 VK-13 turbojet turbofan
 TR3-117 turbojet for UAV Tu-143
 VK-800 , VK800V also at Motor Sich
 VK-1500 variant or derivative of TV3-117 engine
 VK-2500 enhancement of TV3-117
 VK-650V 400 5 - 750 hp turboshaft for Ka-226 . VK-1600V project for  Ka-62
 PDV-4000 4 5000 hp (3 3.8 MW) turboshaft , turboprop

 VK-3000 (VK300V also at OMKB OMO Baranov), VK3500 (TVa-3000) also at Motor Sich, VK-5000 and/or VK-6000 perspective
 GTU-18P GTU-14F GTU-24R GTU-28N Gas Turbines
 MBT and vehicles, wagon locomotives GTs
 GTD-1000T, GTD-1250
 GTD-1400, GTD-1500

Auxiliary power unit
 GTDE-117
 VK-100
 VK-150

References

External links 

 'Full cycle engine development' at UEC Klimov
 Klimov Aircraft APU (Auxiliary power unit)- General Information (archived copy)

Aircraft engine manufacturers of Russia
Aircraft engine manufacturers of the Soviet Union
 
United Engine Corporation
Gas turbine manufacturers
Manufacturing companies based in Saint Petersburg
Russian brands
Design bureaus